Jojea Kwizera (born January 1, 1999) is a Congolese professional soccer player who plays as a midfielder for Major League Soccer club CF Montréal.

Club career 
Jojea Kwizera, was a first-round pick (15th overall) in the 2022 MLS SuperDraft. He was born in Bukavu, Democratic Republic of Congo. Kwizera earned 13 starts in 2021 with Utah Valley University, collecting three goals and eight assists. In 2020, he played in seven games as a starter with one goal and two assists for the Wolverines.

On April 8, 2022, Kwizera signed his first contract with CF Montréal during the 2022 season. Kwizera made his professional debut with Montreal in a 4–1 win against Orlando City SC on May 7, 2022.

Career statistics

References

External links
 Jojea Kwizera | Montreal Impact

1999 births
Living people
Association football midfielders
CF Montréal players
Major League Soccer players
CF Montréal draft picks
Utah Valley Wolverines men's soccer players
Democratic Republic of the Congo footballers
USL League Two players
Ogden City SC players